Pisgah is an unincorporated community in Preston County, West Virginia, United States.

History 
Pisgah started as a small community known as Flat Rock.  In 1881, the Pisgah Methodist Church opened in the community and a post office and school came shortly after. Because they also shared the name "Pisgah," the community changed its name as well.

References 

Unincorporated communities in West Virginia
Unincorporated communities in Preston County, West Virginia